Du Lingyang (321 – 7 April 341), formally Empress Chenggong (成恭皇后) was an empress of the Jin dynasty (266–420) of China. Her husband was Emperor Cheng of Jin. (Some historians believe that her name was simply Du Ling, and that imperial archivists mistakenly attached the character "yang" to her name later. They point out that while the name of a county with the character "ling" in its name was changed pursuant to naming taboo, many names of places with "yang" in their names were not changed. However, there can be other explanations for this.)

Du Lingyang was a daughter of Du Yi (杜乂), a mid-level official and the hereditary Marquis of Dangyang, a grandson of the general Du Yu, who contributed much to Emperor Wu of Jin's conquest of Eastern Wu. Du Yi died early, and Du Lingyang, who did not have any brothers, was raised by her mother Lady Pei.

Du Lingyang was famed for her beauty and virtues, and Emperor Cheng made her his empress on 17 March 336, when both of them were 15. He apparently favored her greatly, but she was childless. She died in April 341, a year before his death.

References

 Fang, Xuanling. Book of Jin (Jin Shu).

321 births
341 deaths
Jin dynasty (266–420) empresses
4th-century Chinese women
4th-century Chinese people
Du clan of Jingzhao